Staines Rugby Football Club (trading as Staines Rugby Football Club Limited) is an English rugby union club founded in 1926 whose first team "The Swans" now play in the London & SE Division – Herts/Middlesex 2.

The Club used to play at the 'Lammas' recreation ground in Staines-upon-Thames but relocated to its own ground The Reeves in Hanworth (London Borough of Hounslow) in the 1960s but still proudly bears the name of the town.

The Club runs a number of senior men's and women's teams with names such as "the Swans" and "the Cobs", and were one of the first in the county to have a Mini and Youth section now offering rugby for children aged 4 to 17.

A notable former mini player was British and Irish Lions Lawrence Dallaglio who started his career at eight.

Club honours
Middlesex 1 champions: 1991–92
London 3 North West champions: 1993–94
London 1 North champions (2): 1994–95, 2009–10
Middlesex Senior Cup winners (7): 1996, 1997, 1998, 1999, 2009, 2010, 2011
London 2 (north v south) promotion playoff winners: 2004–05

References

External links
 Official site

English rugby union teams
Rugby union clubs in London
Staines-upon-Thames
Sport in the London Borough of Hounslow